The 1972–73 AHL season was the 37th season of the American Hockey League. Twelve teams played 76 games each in the schedule. The Cincinnati Swords finished first overall in the regular season, and won the Calder Cup championship.

Team changes
 The New Haven Nighthawks join the AHL as an expansion team, based in New Haven, Connecticut, playing in the East Division.
 The Cleveland Barons move midseason to Jacksonville, Florida,  becoming the Jacksonville Barons.
 The Tidewater Wings are renamed the Virginia Wings.

Final standings
Note: GP = Games played; W = Wins; L = Losses; T = Ties; GF = Goals for; GA = Goals against; Pts = Points;

Scoring leaders

Note: GP = Games played; G = Goals; A = Assists; Pts = Points; PIM = Penalty minutes

 complete list

Calder Cup playoffs

Trophy and award winners
Team awards

Individual awards

Other awards

See also
List of AHL seasons

References
AHL official site
AHL Hall of Fame
HockeyDB

 
American Hockey League seasons
3
3